Tembo is a Bantu language of the Democratic Republic of the Congo.

Writing System

References

Languages of the Democratic Republic of the Congo
Great Lakes Bantu languages

sw:Kishi (lugha)